The 2024 United States elections are scheduled to be held, in large part, on Tuesday, November 5, 2024. During this presidential election year, the President of the United States and Vice President will be elected. In addition, all 435 seats in the United States House of Representatives and 34 of the 100 seats in the United States Senate will be contested to determine the membership of the 119th United States Congress. Thirteen state and territorial governorships and numerous other state and local elections will also be contested.

Federal elections

Presidential election

The 2024 United States presidential election will be the 60th quadrennial U.S. presidential election. This will be the first presidential election under the electoral vote distribution determined by the 2020 census. Presidential electors who will elect the President and Vice President of the United States will be chosen; a simple majority (270) of the 538 electoral votes are required to win the election. President Joe Biden will be eligible to run for a second term, and has indicated that he plans to do so, with Vice President Kamala Harris once again serving as his running mate. Other candidates could potentially challenge Biden in the 2024 Democratic Party presidential primaries, though the last time a sitting president eligible for re-election did not win re-nomination from their respective party was in the 1968 presidential election.

In November 2022, former President Donald Trump announced his candidacy for president. Numerous other individuals have been the subject of media speculation as potential entrants into the 2024 Republican Party presidential primaries.

Congressional elections

Senate elections

Democrats control the majority in the closely-divided Senate following the 2022 U.S. Senate elections, but will have to defend 23 seats in 2024. Three Democratic-held seats up for election are in the heavily Republican-leaning states of Montana, Ohio, and West Virginia, all of which were won comfortably by Trump in both 2016 and 2020. Other potential Republican targets include seats in Arizona, Michigan, Nevada, Pennsylvania, and Wisconsin, while Democrats may target Republican-held seats in Florida and Texas.

Special elections
The following special elections are planned to replace senators who resigned:
 Nebraska Class 2: Republican Ben Sasse resigned his seat on January 8, 2023, to become President of the University of Florida. Pete Ricketts was appointed by Nebraska governor Jim Pillen and a special election for the seat would be scheduled to take place concurrently with the 2024 regular Senate elections.

House of Representatives elections

All 435 voting seats in the United States House of Representatives will be up for election. Additionally, elections will be held to select the delegate for the District of Columbia as well as the delegates from all five U.S. territories, including the Resident Commissioner of Puerto Rico. Republicans hold a narrow majority in the House of Representatives following the 2022 U.S. House elections.

State elections

Gubernatorial elections

Elections will be held for the governorships of eleven of the fifty U.S. states and two U.S. territories. Special elections may be held for vacancies in the other states and territories, if required by respective state/territorial constitutions.

Attorney general elections

Ten states will hold attorney general elections.

Legislative elections

Most legislative chambers will hold regularly-scheduled elections in 2024. The exceptions are the Michigan Senate and both legislative chambers in the states of Alabama, Louisiana, Maryland, Mississippi, New Jersey, and Virginia. In chambers that use staggered terms, only a portion of the seats in the chamber will be up for election.

Other executive and judicial elections

In addition to gubernatorial elections, various other executive and judicial positions will hold elections at the state level in 2024.

Local elections

Mayoral elections
A number of major cities will hold mayoral elections in 2024.

Eligible incumbents
Alexandria, Virginia: Two-term incumbent Justin Wilson is eligible for re-election.
Anchorage, Alaska: One-term incumbent Dave Bronson is eligible for re-election.
Austin, Texas: One-term incumbent Kirk Watson is eligible for re-election.
Baltimore, Maryland: One-term incumbent Brandon Scott is eligible for re-election.
Corpus Christi, Texas: Two-term incumbent Paulette Guajardo is eligible for re-election.
El Paso, Texas: One-term incumbent Oscar Leeser is eligible for re-election.
Fresno, California: One-term incumbent Jerry Dyer is eligible for re-election.
Miami-Dade County, Florida: One-term incumbent Daniella Levine Cava is eligible for re-election.
Milwaukee, Wisconsin: Incumbent Cavalier Johnson is eligible for re-election to a full term.
Honolulu, Hawaii: One-term incumbent Rick Blangiardi is eligible for re-election.
Phoenix, Arizona: One-term incumbent Kate Gallego is eligible for re-election.
Portland, Oregon: Two-term incumbent Ted Wheeler is eligible for re-election.
Raleigh, North Carolina: Two-term incumbent Mary-Ann Baldwin is eligible for re-election.
Salt Lake County, Utah: One-term incumbent Jenny Wilson is eligible for re-election.
San Diego, California: One-term incumbent Todd Gloria is eligible for re-election.
San Francisco, California: One-term incumbent London Breed is eligible for re-election.
San Jose, California: One-term incumbent Matt Mahan is eligible for re-election.
Stockton, California: One-term incumbent Kevin Lincoln is eligible for re-election.

Ineligible or retiring incumbents
Las Vegas, Nevada: Three-term incumbent Carolyn Goodman is term-limited and ineligible to run.
Richmond, Virginia: Two-term incumbent Levar Stoney is term-limited and ineligible to run.
Tulsa, Oklahoma: Two-term incumbent G.T. Bynum is term-limited and ineligible to run.

Table of state, territorial, and federal results

This table shows the partisan results of president, congressional, gubernatorial, and state legislative races held in each state and territory in 2024. Note that not all states and territories hold gubernatorial, state legislative, and Senate elections in 2024. The five territories and Washington, D.C., do not elect members of the Senate, and the territories do not take part in presidential elections; instead, they each elect one non-voting member of the House. Nebraska's unicameral legislature and the governorship and legislature of American Samoa are elected on a non-partisan basis, and political party affiliation is not listed.

Notes

References

 
2024